"Love Is a Many Strangled Thing" is the seventeenth episode of the twenty-second season of the American animated television series The Simpsons. It first aired on Fox in the United States on March 27, 2011.

Plot
After saving Mr. Burns' life, Homer wins tickets to an NFL game between the Springfield Atoms and the Miami Dolphins, and takes the whole family.  During the game, everybody starts to dance in front of the screen, but Bart does not want to dance, saying "Everybody Dance Now" is 'a little bossy' for his liking. Homer tries to make him dance by tickling him, but he inadvertently humiliates Bart in front of the stadium crowd when he tickles Bart until he wets himself. To make matters worse, the stadium owners take pity on Bart and try to dry his shorts off by opening the roof, but Russian spy satellites capture the image of Bart with wet shorts, leading to widespread humiliation on the Internet, and an invasion by Russia, who see his urine-soaked shorts as a sign of American weakness.

Later that night, Marge scolds Homer for hurting Bart's feelings, and encourages him to enroll in a fathering enrichment class taught by therapist Dr. Zander. During the class, Homer casually mentions that he often strangles Bart for his mischievous behavior. Shocked to learn of Homer's violence towards Bart, Dr. Zander conducts a series of treatments in the next session.  Dr. Zander's friend, the towering basketball player Kareem Abdul-Jabbar, teaches Homer what it feels like "to be young, small, and terrified" by strangling him mercilessly all the time, even going as far as letting his friends strangle Homer as well.

Unfortunately, the therapy works too well and Homer can no longer strangle Bart, even when the boy misbehaves, because he is traumatized by the therapeutic session. Realizing that the anger management sessions have turned Homer into a pushover, Bart takes advantage of him and becomes a school bully, as the school can no longer count on Homer's aggressiveness to protect them from Bart. Appalled by Bart's abuse towards Homer, Marge decides to take Bart to Dr. Zander to change his ways, but to her shock, she finds out that Zander has become homeless due to the current economic downturn. Marge begs Dr. Zander to fix Bart and Homer for $23 and a can of beans, and Zander accepts.

Dr. Zander takes Bart and Homer on a trip while Marge and Lisa spend their time watching sad horse movies. During their trip, Zander tries several exercises to encourage Homer to have confidence in Bart but, unfortunately, Bart abuses Homer's ignorance and enjoys when he gets hurt, much to Zander's frustration. The ultimate test for Bart's and Homer's relationship is that Bart must save his father from being hanged in a tree, but Bart is more focused on text-pranking Moe than looking out for Homer's welfare. Dr. Zander, realizing just how annoying Bart is, decides to kill him, but Bart manages to free Homer, who saves him. In revenge for Zander's behavior, Homer and Bart sue the psychologist, and are awarded his sole remaining possession: a hole in the large tree he lives in, a place where Homer and Bart finally reconcile and bond.

Production
The opening sequence of the episode begins with the opening notes of the Futurama theme in place of usual theme, with the Planet Express ship flying across the screen. Futurama is another animated series created by Matt Groening, and was officially renewed for a seventh season the same week the episode aired.

The closing credits are followed by the message "Dedicated to the Memory of Elizabeth Taylor" appearing beneath a picture of Maggie Simpson. Taylor voiced Maggie's first word, "Daddy", in the fourth season episode "Lisa's First Word"; she died on March 23, 2011, four days before the episode premiered.

Reception
In its original American broadcast, "Love is a Many Strangled Thing" was viewed by an estimated 6.14 million households, with a 2.8 Nielsen rating and 8% share of the audience between the ages of 18 and 49.
This marked a slight rise in the ratings from the previous episode, "A Midsummer's Nice Dream".

The A.V. Club writer Rowan Kaiser called the episode "solid" commenting that "There was just a consistent stream of amusing lines, steadily increasing in frequency, until I realized that I'd been chuckling essentially from the start of the second act until the end of the fourth". He ultimately gave the episode a B+.

Controversy
The episode was first broadcast on Channel 4, a British public service broadcaster, in December 2014. The station edited parts, including the hanging scene, but still received two complaints. Channel 4 made further edits, but ten months later, by human error, showed the same cut of the episode. Complaints were made to Ofcom, the broadcasting standards authority, who deemed that the scenes of hanging and Homer not being able to resist being strangled by Kareem Abdul-Jabbar would be unsuitable for children. Channel 4 declared that the episode would only be shown again after 9 pm, the watershed for content.

References

External links 
 

2011 American television episodes
The Simpsons (season 22) episodes
Television episodes about domestic violence
Animation controversies in television
Television controversies in the United Kingdom
Television censorship in the United Kingdom